The Twelve Theses were issued in early April 1933 by Press and Propaganda Section of the German Student Union and called for German university students to purge German language and literature of Jewish influence and to restore those aspects of German culture to their "pure" volkische traditions. The theses were posted on university campuses throughout Germany prior to the May 1933 book burnings.

Text

The English text of the theses (as those are posted to the right) reads as follows:

Commentary
While the theses targeted the "Jewish spirit" (jüdischer Geist) and books expressing this, it also attacked concepts that were "un-German" (undeutsch). It is not clear from the theses themselves whether this term is intended to be synonymous with "Jewishness".
The theses do not themselves expressly call for book burning.
Thesis 1 expressly implies that there should be no foreign literature in Germany, entailing a complete ban of all non-German literature, at least on works translated into German.
Theses 11 and 12 would reserve German universities exclusively to German students and professors, devoid of foreign elements.

See also
Nazi book burnings
National Socialist Program
Hutu Ten Commandments

Footnotes

References

Nazi culture
Nazi propaganda
1933 documents
1933 in Germany
Incitement to genocide